Jiang Yanmei (Simplified Chinese: 江彦媚; born 28 February 1981) is a Chinese-born Singaporean badminton player. She competed at the 2004 and 2008 Summer Olympics; 2002 and 2006 Commonwealth Games; and also 2006 Asian Games.

Early life 
Born in Guangdong, China, Jiang moved to Singapore in 1999, and joining the national squad shortly after under the Foreign Sports Talent Scheme.

Career 
Jiang was part of Singapore women's team that won the gold medal at the 2003 SEA Games, and bronze medal at 2006 Asian Games. She also helps the Singapore mixed team to win bronze at the 2002 Manchester Commonwealth Games. Teamed-up with Li Yujia, they won the women's doubles silver medal at the 2006 Melbourne Commonwealth Games, losing the final to Malaysian pair Chin Eei Hui and Wong Pei Tty.

After her playing career, Jiang became a coach with the Singapore Badminton Association.

Awards 
Jiang received the 2005 Meritorious Award from the Singapore National Olympic Committee.

Achievements

Commonwealth Games 
Women's doubles

Southeast Asian Games 
Women's singles

Women's doubles

BWF Grand Prix 
The BWF Grand Prix had two levels, the Grand Prix and Grand Prix Gold. It was a series of badminton tournaments sanctioned by the Badminton World Federation (BWF) and played between 2007 and 2017. The World Badminton Grand Prix was sanctioned by the International Badminton Federation from 1983 to 2006.

Women's doubles

International Series/Satellite
Women's singles

Women's doubles

Mixed doubles

References

External links
 
 
 
 
 
 
 

1981 births
Living people
Badminton players from Guangdong
Chinese emigrants to Singapore
Singaporean sportspeople of Chinese descent
Naturalised citizens of Singapore
Singaporean female badminton players
Badminton players at the 2004 Summer Olympics
Badminton players at the 2008 Summer Olympics
Olympic badminton players of Singapore
Badminton players at the 2002 Commonwealth Games
Badminton players at the 2006 Commonwealth Games
Commonwealth Games silver medallists for Singapore
Commonwealth Games medallists in badminton
Badminton players at the 2006 Asian Games
Asian Games bronze medalists for Singapore
Asian Games medalists in badminton
Medalists at the 2006 Asian Games
Competitors at the 2003 Southeast Asian Games
Competitors at the 2005 Southeast Asian Games
Competitors at the 2007 Southeast Asian Games
Southeast Asian Games gold medalists for Singapore
Southeast Asian Games silver medalists for Singapore
Southeast Asian Games bronze medalists for Singapore
Southeast Asian Games medalists in badminton
Medallists at the 2002 Commonwealth Games
Medallists at the 2006 Commonwealth Games